RM2 or variant, may refer to:

 RM2, the postcode for a part of Romford, see RM postcode area
 Valmet RM 2, a class of two-bogie four-axle tram
 Mendoza RM2, a light machine gun from Mexico
 RocketMotorTwo (RM2), a Tier-1b rocket engine for SpaceShipTwo
 RM2, a cancelled space station Russian Research Module
 RM2, a type of railcar in the NZR RM class

See also
 RM (disambiguation)
 RMII